Merryweather may refer to:

People
 Alice Merryweather (born 1996), American alpine skier
 Andrew Merryweather (born 1961), Australian rules footballer
 George Merryweather (1794–1870), English inventor of the tempest prognosticator, a leech-based weather predicting gadget
 James Merryweather (1929–2000), English cricketer
 John Merryweather (1932–2019), Aruban landscape architect and politician
 Julian Merryweather (born 1991), American baseball player
 Merryweather (comics artist), webcomic author
 Neil Merryweather (born 1945), Canadian singer, bass player and songwriter

Others
 Merryweather (band), a Canadian rock band from the 1960s
 Merryweather helmet, a firefighter's helmet used by British Victorian era fire brigades
 Merryweather, a character in Disney's Sleeping Beauty
 Merryweather & Sons, British builders of steam fire engines and steam tram engines
 Irene Merryweather, fictional character appearing in the Marvel Comics universe

See also
 Merriweather
 Meriwether (disambiguation)